Gaehwasan Station is a subway station on Seoul Subway Line 5 in Gangseo-gu, Seoul. Its name comes from the nearby Gaehwasan mountain.

Station layout

Vicinity
Public Centers:
 Banghwa 1-dong Citizen's Center
 Banghwa 2-dong Citizen's Center
 Gaehwa Peace Center
 
Schools:
 Gaehwa Elementary School
 Banghwa Elementary School
 Banghwa Middle School
 Seongji Middle School
 Seongji High School
 Airport High School
 Hanseo High School

References

Railway stations opened in 1996
Seoul Metropolitan Subway stations
Metro stations in Gangseo District, Seoul